This article serves as an index – as complete as possible – of all the honorific orders or similar decorations awarded by Austria, classified by Monarchies chapter and Republics chapter, and, under each chapter, recipients' countries and the detailed list of recipients.

Awards 
The Decoration of Honour for Services to the Republic of Austria was awarded to the following personalities:

Austria  
 Heinz Fischer (2004-2016) : Grand Star and Master of the Decoration of Honour for Services to the Republic of Austria (2004)
 Alexander Van der Bellen (2017-) : Grand Star and Master of the Decoration of Honour for Services to the Republic of Austria (2017)

Monarchies 

European monarchies

United Kingdom 
 Queen Elizabeth II :  Grand Star of the Decoration of Honour for Services to the Republic of Austria (1966) 
 Anne, Princess Royal : Grand Decoration of Honour in Gold with Sash for Services to the Republic of Austria (1969)

Norway 
See also decorations pages (mark °) : Harald, Sonja, Haakon, Mette-Marit, Mârtha Louise, Astrid & Ragnhild

 Harald V of Norway : Grand Star of the Decoration of Honour for Services to the Republic of Austria (1964, when Crown Prince) 
 Queen Sonja of Norway : Grand Star of the Decoration of Honour for Services to the Republic of Austria (1978, when Crown Princess) 
 Crown Prince Haakon: Grand Decoration of Honour in Gold with Sash for Services to the Republic of Austria (2007) °
 Crown Princess Mette-Marit: Grand Decoration of Honour in Gold with Sash for Services to the Republic of Austria (2007) °

Sweden 
 Carl XVI Gustaf of Sweden : Grand Star of the Decoration of Honour for Services to the Republic of Austria (1976) 
 Queen Silvia of Sweden : Grand Star of the Decoration of Honour for Services to the Republic of Austria (1979) 
 Victoria, Crown Princess : Grand Decoration of Honour in Gold with Sash for Services to the Republic of Austria (1997)

Denmark 
Official website pages (click on "Decorations") : Margrethe – Henrik – Frederik – Mary – Joachim – Marie – Benedikte

 Margrethe II of Denmark : Grand Star of the Decoration of Honour for Services to the Republic of Austria (1964)

Netherlands 
 King Willem-Alexander of the Netherlands : 
 Grand Star of the Decoration of Honour for Services to the Republic of Austria (2022)
 Queen Máxima of the Netherlands :
 Grand Star of the Decoration of Honour for Services to the Republic of Austria (2022)
 Princess Beatrix of the Netherlands (former Queen) :
 Grand Decoration of Honour in Gold with Sash for Services to the Republic of Austria (1961) 
 Grand Star of the Decoration of Honour for Services to the Republic of Austria (1994) 
 Princess Irene of the Netherlands : Grand Decoration of Honour in Gold with Sash for Services to the Republic of Austria (1961)

Belgium 
 King Albert II of the Belgians :  Grand Star of the Decoration of Honour for Services to the Republic of Austria (1958) 
 Queen Paola of the Belgians :  Grand Star of the Decoration of Honour for Services to the Republic of Austria (1997) 

 King Philippe of the Belgians :  Grand Star of the Decoration of Honour for Services to the Republic of Austria (2022) 
Former imperial orders : 
 King Albert II of the Belgians : Knight of the Order of the Golden Fleece (Austrian branch, House of Habsburg)
 King Philippe of the Belgians : Knight of the Order of the Golden Fleece (2008, Austrian branch, House of Habsburg) 
 Prince Lorenz : Knight of the Order of the Golden Fleece (Austrian branch, House of Habsburg)

Luxembourg 
 Henri, Grand Duke of Luxembourg : Grand Star of the Decoration of Honour for Services to the Republic of Austria (2013) 
 Maria Teresa, Grand Duchess of Luxembourg : Grand Star of the Decoration of Honour for Services to the Republic of Austria (2013)

Spain 
 Juan Carlos I of Spain : Grand Star of the Decoration of Honour for Services to the Republic of Austria (1978) 
 Queen Sofía of Spain : Grand Star of the Decoration of Honour for Services to the Republic of Austria (1978) 
 Felipe, Prince of Asturias : Grand Decoration of Honour in Gold with Sash for Services to the Republic of Austria (1995) 
 Infanta Elena, Duchess of Lugo : Grand Decoration of Honour in Gold with Sash for Services to the Republic of Austria (1997) 
 Infanta Cristina, Duchess of Palma de Mallorca : Grand Decoration of Honour in Gold with Sash for Services to the Republic of Austria (1997) 
Former members :
 Jaime de Marichalar : Grand Decoration of Honour in Gold with Sash for Services to the Republic of Austria (1997)

Liechtenstein 

 Hans-Adam II, Prince of Liechtenstein : Grand Star of the Decoration of Honour for Services to the Republic of Austria (1991) 
 Marie, Princess of Liechtenstein : Grand Star of the Decoration of Honour for Services to the Republic of Austria (2004) 
 Alois, Hereditary Prince of Liechtenstein:  Grand Decoration of Honour in Gold with Sash for Services to the Republic of Austria (2000) 
 Sophie, Hereditary Princess of Liechtenstein:  Grand Decoration of Honour in Gold with Sash for Services to the Republic of Austria (2018)
 Nikolaus, Prince of Liechtenstein : Grand Decoration of Honour in Gold with Sash for Services to the Republic of Austria (1992) 

Middle East monarchies

Jordan 
 Dowager Queen Noor of Jordan : Grand Star of the Decoration of Honour for Services to the Republic of Austria (1978) 
 Abdullah II of Jordan :
 Grand Decoration of Honour in Gold with Sash (2nd Class) for Services to the Republic of Austria (1987) 
 Grand Star of the Decoration of Honour for Services to the Republic of Austria (2001) 
 Queen Rania of Jordan : Grand Star of the Decoration of Honour for Services to the Republic of Austria (2001) 
 Princess Alia bint Al Hussein of Jordan : Grand Decoration of Honour in Gold (6th Class) for Services to the Republic of Austria (1976) 
 Prince Ali Bin Al-Hussein of Jordan : Grand Decoration of Honour in Gold with Sash (2nd Class) for Services to the Republic of Austria (2001) 
 Prince Hassan bin Talal : Grand Decoration of Honour in Gold with Sash (2nd Class) for Services to the Republic of Austria (1977-2004)

Qatar 

 Hamad bin Khalifa Al Thani  :  Grand Star of the Decoration of Honour for Services to the Republic of Austria (2010) 

Asian monarchies

Thailand 
 Queen Sirikit: Grand Star of the Decoration of Honour for Services to the Republic of Austria (1964) 
 Princess Sirindhorn: Grand Decoration of Honour in Gold with Sash (Second Class) for Services to the Republic of Austria (2004)

Japan 
 Emperor Akihito : Grand Star of the Decoration of Honour for Services to the Republic of Austria (1999) 
 Empress Michiko : Grand Star of the Decoration of Honour for Services to the Republic of Austria (1999) 
 Crown Prince Naruhito : Grand Decoration of Honour in Gold with Sash for Services to the Republic of Austria (1999) 
 Crown Princess Masako : Grand Decoration of Honour in Gold with Sash for Services to the Republic of Austria (1999)

Former monarchies

Iran 
 Farah Pahlavi: Grand Star of the Decoration of Honour for Services to the Republic of Austria (1965) 
 Crown Prince Reza Pahlavi : Grand Star of the Decoration of Honour for Services to the Republic of Austria (1976)

Sovereign entities

Order of Malta 
 Fra' Matthew Festing (2008-) : Grand Star of the Decoration of Honour for Services to the Republic of Austria (2012)

Republics

Bulgaria 

 President Petar Stoyanov (1997-2002) :  Grand Star of the Decoration of Honour for Services to the Republic of Austria (1999)

Croatia 

 President Stjepan Mesić (2000–2010) : Grand Star of the Decoration of Honour for Services to the Republic of Austria (2001)

Cyprus 

 President Tassos Papadopoulos (2003–2008) : Grand Star of the Decoration of Honour for Services to the Republic of Austria (2007) 
 Fotini Papadopoulou, his wife : Grand Decoration of Honour in Gold with Sash for Services to the Republic of Austria (2007)

Czech Republic 

 President Václav Klaus (2003-13) : Grand Star of the Decoration of Honour for Services to the Republic of Austria (2009)

Estonia 

 President Kersti Kaljulaid : Grand Star of the Decoration of Honour for Services to the Republic of Austria (2021)
 Georgi-Rene Maksimovski, his husband : Grand Decoration of Honour in Gold with Sash for Services to the Republic of Austria (2021)

Finland 

 President Tarja Halonen (2000–2012) : Grand Star of the Decoration of Honour for Services to the Republic of Austria (2006) 
 Pentti Arajärvi, her husband :  Grand Decoration of Honour in Gold with Sash for Services to the Republic of Austria (2011) 
 President Sauli Niinistö (2012-) : Grand Star of the Decoration of Honour for Services to the Republic of Austria (2016)

France 

 President Jacques Chirac (1995–2007) :  Grand Star of the Decoration of Honour for Services to the Republic of Austria (1998)

Germany 

 Christina Rau:  Grand Decoration of Honour in Gold with Sash for Services to the Republic of Austria (2004) 
 President Horst Köhler (2004-2010) : Grand Decoration of Honour in Gold with Star (4th Cl.) for Services to the Republic of Austria (2003, when head of the IMF)

Greece 

 President Karolos Papoulias (2005-2015) : Grand Star of the Decoration of Honour for Services to the Republic of Austria (2007 ) 
 May Papoulia, his wife : Grand Decoration of Honour in Gold with Sash for Services to the Republic of Austria (2007)

Italy 

 President Giorgio Napolitano (2006-2015) : Grand Star of the Decoration of Honour for Services to the Republic of Austria (2007) 
 Clio Napolitano, his wife : Grand Decoration of Honour in Gold with Sash for Services to the Republic of Austria (2007) 
 President Sergio Mattarella (2015-) : Grand Star of the Decoration of Honour for Services to the Republic of Austria (2019)
 Laura Mattarella, his daughter : Grand Decoration of Honour in Gold with Sash for Services to the Republic of Austria (2019)

Lithuania 

 President Valdas Adamkus (2004–2009) : Grand Star of the Decoration of Honour for Services to the Republic of Austria (2009)

Poland 

 President Aleksander Kwaśniewski (1995–2005) : Grd Star of the Decoration of Honour for Services to the Republic of Austria (1998)

Portugal 

 President Jorge Sampaio (1996–2006) : Grand Star of the Decoration of Honour for Services to the Republic of Austria (2002) 
 Maria José Rodrigues Ritta, his wife : Grand Decoration of Honour in Gold with Sash for Services to the Republic of Austria (2002) 
 President Marcelo Rebelo de Sousa (2016-) : Grand Star of the Decoration of Honour for Services to the Republic of Austria (2019)

Romania 

 President Emil Constantinescu (1996–2000) : Grand Star of the Decoration of Honour for Services to the Republic of Austria (1999)

Slovakia 

 President Rudolf Schuster (1999–2004) : Grand Star of the Decoration of Honour for Services to the Republic of Austria (2004)

Slovenia 

 President Danilo Türk (2007–2012) : Grand Star of the Decoration of Honour for Services to the Republic of Austria (2011) 
 President Borut Pahor (2012-) : Grand Star of the Decoration of Honour for Services to the Republic of Austria (2022)

Ukraine 

 President Leonid Kuchma (1994–2005) : Grand Star of the Decoration of Honour for Services to the Republic of Austria (1998)

Egypt 

 Diplomat and politician Mohamed ElBaradei :  Grand Star of the Decoration of Honour for Services to the Republic of Austria (2009)

Kazakhstan 

 President Nursultan Nazarbayev (1990-) : Grand Star of the Decoration of Honour for Services to the Republic of Austria (2000)

Mexico 

 President Luis Echeverría (1970–1976) : Grand Star of the Decoration of Honour for Services to the Republic of Austria (1974) 
 Pres. Vicente Fox Quesada (2000–06) : Grand Star of the Decoration of Honour for Services to the Republic of Austria (2005)

Algeria 

 President Abdelaziz Bouteflika (1999-) : Grand Star of the Decoration of Honour for Services to the Republic of Austria (2003)

Mali 

 President Amadou Toumani Touré (2002-2012) : Grand Star of the Decoration of Honour for Services to the Republic of Austria (2009)

Senegal 

 President Abdou Diouf (1981-2000) : Grand Star of the Decoration of Honour for Services to the Republic of Austria (1986) 
  	Elizabeth Diouf, his wife : Grand Star of the Decoration of Honour for Services to the Republic of Austria (1986)

Tunisia 

 President Zine El Abidine Ben Ali (1987–2011) : Grand Star of the Decoration of Honour for Services to the Republic of Austria (1989)

References 

 
Austrian